Rush Creek is a  tributary of the Kishwaukee River in northern Illinois.

There is another Rush Creek that is a tributary of the Mississippi River in Carroll County.

Course
Rush Creek's origin is in a complex of wetlands near Harvard, Illinois, two miles southeast. The stream then flows southwest until it empties into the main stem of the Kishwaukee River one mile east of Garden Prairie.

Description
Approximately 65% of the main stem of Rush Creek has been channelized (ditched and straighten), however 50% of those areas are showing signs of recovery. Despite the channelization and encroachment from agriculture many of the stream's features such as riffles can still be seen.

Wildlife
Twenty-nine species of fish have been identified within Rush Creek and its tributaries, two of those species have not been seen in the watershed since 1965 - the northern pike and the largescale stoneroller. Three animal species are on state or federal endangered or threatened lists - river otter, and two mussels, Elliptio dilatata (Spike) and Alasmidonta viridis (Slippershell).

References

Tributaries of the Kishwaukee River
Rivers of McHenry County, Illinois
Rivers of Illinois